The Independent Turkey Party (BTP) is a nationalist and Kemalist political party founded on 25 September 2001 by Haydar Baş.

In the June 2015 general election, the BTP received 96,465 votes with no parliamentary seats. In 2023 Presidential election, the BTP decided to support Kemal Kılıçdaroğlu.

Leaders
2001 Ata Selçuk
2002 Ali Gedik
2002–2020 Haydar Baş
2020–present Hüseyin Baş

Election results

General Elections

Local Elections

References

External links
Party website

2001 establishments in Turkey
Alevis
Civic nationalism
Economic nationalism
Kemalist political parties
Political parties established in 2001
Political parties in Turkey
Political parties of minorities